Acidic rock or acid rock refers to the chemical composition of igneous rocks that has 63% wt% SiO2 content. Rocks described as acidic usually contain more than 20% of free quartz. Typical acidic rocks are granite or rhyolite.

Term is used in chemical classification of igneous rock based on the content of silica (SiO2). Due to the fact that chemical analyzes are not always available, especially during the fieldwork, classification based on the mineral (modal) composition is more often used (dividing the igneous rocks into felsic/leucocratic, mafic/melanocratic and ultramafic).

The term "silicic", widely used in North America, has wider meaning, however, is often used as broadly synonymous with "acidic".

Terms describing composition of igneous rocks as acidic or basic evolved during the 19th century. It was based on the idea that high silica rocks are acidic and on the contrary the rocks with low silica content are basic. Despite this idea is erroneous in chemical sence (acidic rocks don't have low pH), both terms are used in modified view.

See also 
 Felsic rock

References

External links 
 Igneous Rocks

Petrology